Kamila Vokoun Hájková (born 25 September 1987 in Polička) is a Czech former competitive ice dancer. With David Vincour, she is a two-time Ondrej Nepela Memorial bronze medalist, the 2005 Golden Spin of Zagreb bronze medalist, a two-time Pavel Roman Memorial champion, and a five-time Czech national champion. The two competed in the final segment at seven ISU Championships and at the 2010 Winter Olympics.

Career
Hájková began skating at age six, appearing as a singles skater until 15, and then switched to ice dance. She competed with David Vincour. The two made their junior international debut in October 2003, placing tenth at the Junior Grand Prix event in Zagreb, Croatia.

Ranked 14th in the compulsory dance, 9th in the original dance, and 11th in the free dance, Hájková/Vincour finished tenth overall at the 2005 World Junior Championships in Kitchener, Ontario, Canada.

Hájková/Vincour moved up to the senior ranks the following season. In September, they took bronze at the 2005 Ondrej Nepela Memorial. The following month, they finished 12th at the 2005 Karl Schäfer Memorial, the final qualifying opportunity for the 2006 Winter Olympics in Turin. Their result was insufficient to earn a spot at the Olympics. They won two medals in November – bronze at the 2005 Golden Spin of Zagreb and gold at the 2005 Pavel Roman Memorial. They placed 19th at the 2006 European Championships in Lyon, France. At the 2006 World Championships in Calgary, they were eliminated after the original dance, finishing 27th overall.

Hájková/Vincour finished 17th at the 2007 European Championships in Warsaw, Poland. Vincour was later hospitalized and underwent surgery and, as a result, the duo missed the 2007 World Championships.

They began the next season with a win at the 2007 Pavel Roman Memorial, outscoring Carolina Hermann / Daniel Hermann and Lucie Myslivečková / Matěj Novák. They would qualify to the final segment at both the 2008 European Championships in Zagreb, where they placed 17th, and at the 2008 World Championships in Gothenburg, where they finished 23rd.

Hájková/Vincour placed 17th at the 2009 European Championships in Helsinki, Finland, but did not appear at the 2009 World Championships.

In September 2009, the Czech Republic earned an Olympic spot. Hájková/Vincour won bronze at the 2009 Ondrej Nepela Memorial and were sent to the 2010 Winter Olympics in Vancouver, where they finished 21st.

Hájková retired from competition after the 2010 Olympics and began coaching. She was an ambassador for the Czech team at the 2012 Winter Youth Olympics. In 2014, she became the project manager at the International Sambo Federation. In July 2022, she moved to the Fédération Aéronautique Internationale as Members and Anti-Doping Manager.

Programs
(with Vincour)

Competitive highlights
GP: Grand Prix; JGP: Junior Grand Prix

 With Vincour

References

External links

Official website of Hájková and Vincour

1987 births
Living people
People from Polička
Czech female ice dancers
Figure skaters at the 2010 Winter Olympics
Olympic figure skaters of the Czech Republic
Competitors at the 2009 Winter Universiade